is a Japanese super robot manga series written and illustrated by Go Nagai. The first manga version was serialized in Shueisha's Weekly Shōnen Jump from October 1972 to August 1973, and it later was reissued in Kodansha TV Magazine from October 1973 to September 1974. It was adapted into an anime television series which aired on Fuji TV from December 1972 to September 1974. A second manga series was released alongside the TV show, this one drawn by Gosaku Ota, which started and ended almost at the same time as the TV show. Mazinger Z has spawned several sequels and spin-off series, among them being Great Mazinger, UFO Robot Grendizer and Mazinkaiser.

Mazinger Z: Infinity, a theatrical film sequel, taking place 10 years after the Great Mazinger series, was animated by Toei Animation and released in theaters on January 13, 2018.

Plot 

Mazinger Z is an enormous super robot, constructed with a fictional metal called , which is forged from a new element (Japanium) mined from a reservoir found only in the sediment of Mt. Fuji, in Japan. The mecha was built by Professor Juzo Kabuto as a secret weapon against the forces of evil, represented in the series by the Mechanical Beasts of Dr. Hell. The latter was the German member of a Japanese archeological team, which discovered ruins of a lost pre-Grecian civilization on an island named Bardos, the Mycéne Empire. One of their findings was that the Mycene used an army of steel titans about 20 meters in height. Finding prototypes of those titans underground which could be remote-controlled and realizing their immense power on the battlefield, Dr. Hell goes insane and has all the other scientists of his research team killed except for Professor Kabuto, who manages to escape. The lone survivor goes back to Japan and attempts to warn the world of its imminent danger. Meanwhile, Dr. Hell establishes his headquarters on a mobile island, forms the new Underground Empire, and plans to use the Mechanical Monsters to become the new ruler of the world. To counter this, Kabuto constructs Mazinger Z and manages to finish it just before being killed by a bomb planted by Hell's right-hand person, Baron Ashura, a half-man, half-woman. As he lays dying, he manages to inform his grandson Koji Kabuto about the robot and its use. Koji becomes the robot's pilot, and from that point on battles both the continuous mechanical monsters, and the sinister henchmen sent by Doctor Hell.

Development 
In his Manga Works series, Go Nagai reveals that he had always loved Tetsuwan Atom and Tetsujin-28 as a child, and wanted to make his own robot anime. However, for the longest time he was unable to produce a concept that he felt did not borrow too heavily from those two shows. One day, Nagai observed a traffic jam and mused to himself that the drivers in back would surely love a way to bypass the ones in front. From that thought came his ultimate inspiration: a giant robot that could be controlled from the inside, like a car. In his original concepts, the titular robot was Energer Z, which was controlled by a motorcycle that was driven up its back and into its head (an idea which was recycled for the Diana A robot). However, with the sudden popularity of Kamen Rider, Nagai replaced the motorcycle with a hovercraft. He later redesigned Energer Z, renaming it Mazinger Z to evoke the image of a demon god (Ma, 魔, meaning demon and Jin, 神, meaning god).

The motif of the Hover Pilder docking itself into Mazinger's head also borrows from Nagai's 1971 manga Demon Lord Dante (the prototype for his more popular Devilman), in which the titular giant demon has a human head (of Ryo Utsugi, the young man who merged with him) in his forehead. Koji Kabuto takes his surname (the Japanese word for a helmet) because he controls Mazinger Z from its head.

Adaptations

Anime

First English dub 
In 1977, Toei commissioned Hawaii-based M&M Communications to produce an English dub of 30 episodes of Mazinger Z for international markets. Unlike other English adaptations of other anime series at the time, Mazinger Z was left with its plot and character names unaltered. The English dub aired in Hawaii and the Philippines; it proved so popular in the Philippines that additional episodes were locally dubbed.

Tranzor Z 
In the United States, Three B. Productions Ltd., a production company headed by Bunker Jenkins, developed Mazinger Z for American television by producing an English-dubbed version, which Jenkins retitled Tranzor Z. This adaptation aired in 1985, and was, like many English-dubbed anime shows that were on American TV at the time, re-edited for American audiences. Many of the Japanese names used in Mazinger Z were changed for its adaptation into Tranzor Z; for example, Koji Kabuto became Tommy Davis, Sayaka Yumi became Jessica Wells, Shiro became Toad, Professor Yumi became Dr. Wells, Dr. Hell became Dr. Daemon, and Baron Ashura became Devleen. Only 65 out of the 92 episodes were dubbed into English, as 65 was the minimum number of episodes required for syndication.

Sequels 

The Mazinger Z anime ran to a total of 92 TV episodes from 1972 to 1974. Its period of greatest popularity lasted from roughly October 1973 to March 1974, during which time it regularly scored audience ratings in the high twenties; episode 68, broadcast March 17, 1974, achieved the series' highest rating of 30.4%, making Mazinger Z one of the highest-rated anime series of all time (1). It culminated in the destruction of the original robot by new enemies (after Doctor Hell's final defeat in the penultimate episode) and the immediate introduction of its successor, Great Mazinger, an improved version of Mazinger, along with its pilot, Tetsuya Tsurugi. The idea of replacing the first robot with Great Mazinger (sometimes called Shin Mazinger Z) is a variation of a death-rebirth myth found in most Japanese action series: the title character, even if it is only a robot, is never truly defeated or destroyed, only improved upon, and replaced by the next version. Koji and Mazinger Z come back in the last episodes of Great Mazinger to help their successors defeat the forces of evil.

Another sequel, albeit in a different line, was introduced in 1975, with the appearance of Grendizer, set in the Mazinger and Great Mazinger story continuity that included Koji Kabuto as a supporting character.

The shows spawned so-called "team-up movies" early on, which were like longer episodes that teamed up Mazinger Z with one of Go Nagai's other creations, as in Mazinger Z vs. Devilman (マジンガーZ対デビルマン) in 1973 as well as Mazinger Z Vs. Dr. Hell (マジンガーＺ対ドクターヘル) and Mazinger Z Vs. The Great General of Darkness (マジンガーZ対暗黒大将軍) both released in 1974.

On the franchise's 45th anniversary, a sequel film titled Mazinger Z: Infinity was announced, taking place 10 years after the events of the original series. It was animated by Toei Animation and directed by Junji Shimizu and written by Takahiro Ozawa. It is released theatrically in Japan on January 13, 2018. Viz Media licensed the film for its theatrical release outside Japan.

 
In the 1980s, on behalf of Dynamic Planning, Masami Ōbari and other independent animators  (Toshiki Hirano) not part of Toei Animation began work on a miniseries of Mazinger Z. The OVA (Original Video Animation) would have been called Dai-Mazinger (or Daimajinga, 大魔神我) and would have presented the same characters known to the general public, starting with the main protagonist Koji. The robot would be more realistic: for example, it would have exhaust pipes and its rocket fists would not be able to automatically return to its arms.

The news, initially protected by tight secrecy, managed to leak and was spread by the specialized press. Toei protested, saying to Dynamic that the rights of the animation of Mazinger was only theirs and that they did not tolerate a Mazinger animated by others. As a consequence, the Daimajinga project was blocked. This wasn't helped with the fact that Nagai was in the middle of a court battle with Toei, suing them for not properly crediting him and not paying him royalties over the creation of Gaiking in 1976. However, since then the relationship between Nagai and Toei had steadily improved.

Thirty years after the start of the original program, Nagai's company Dynamic Planning released a continuation of the original Mazinger series as an OVA—named Mazinkaiser (mazinkaizā)—in 2002. This work would be succeeded by the movie Mazinkaiser: Deathmatch! Ankoku Daishogun, which in some ways served as a partial remake of Mazinger Z vs. the General of Darkness.

Since 2007, several rumors surfaced regarding a new series which would be based on the Z Mazinger manga. In February 2009, it was officially announced a new Mazinger anime called  which later began airing on April 4, 2009.

On the 2010 June issue of the magazine Hobby Japan, released in April 2010, a new OVA series was revealed, called . The OVA also has a novelization, serialized in the ASCII Media Works magazine Dengeki Hobby, and a net manga, published by Emotion (Bandai Visual) in the mobile phones magazine Shu 2 Comic Gekkin.

Crossovers

Transformers
In February 2019, it was announced that Transformers and Mazinger Z would crossover. A manga featuring the two franchises was released on March 28 of the same year.

Merchandise 
Mazinger remains one of Go Nagai's most enduring success stories, spawning many products in the realm of merchandising, model kits, plastic and die-cast metal toys (the now famous Soul of Chogokin line), action figures and other collectibles. Mazinger has also been successful in the video game area (at least in Japan), as one of the main stars in the acclaimed battle simulation game series Super Robot Wars, released by Banpresto, featuring characters and units from almost all Mazinger-related shows, alongside other anime franchises.

In 1994, Banpresto released an arcade game called Mazinger Z which was a vertical shoot 'em up with three selectable characters: Mazinger Z, Great Mazinger and Grendizer. Hamster Corporation announced that Mazinger Z will be joining the Arcade Archives series later in 2023. 

A 40-foot tall statue of Mazinger Z was built in a suburb called "Mas del Plata" in Tarragona (Catalonia, Spain) in the early 1980s, to serve as the suburb's entrance, yet the suburb was never completed and the statue remains there.

DVD 
Discotek Media acquired the American home video rights to the show. The result was a release of all 92 episodes of the original series in 2 volumes: Mazinger Z TV Series Vol 1, Ep. 1–46 and Mazinger Z TV Series Vol 2, Ep. 47–92. Discotek Media later released a double feature DVD on April 29, 2014, alongside Amazing Nuts!, Jin-Roh: The Wolf Brigade, and Unico.

Reception and influence 

Mazinger Z helped to create the 1970s boom in mecha anime. The series is noteworthy for introducing many of the accepted stock features of super robot anime genres, including the first occurrence of mecha robots being piloted by a user from within a cockpit.

In 2001, the Japanese magazine Animage elected Mazinger Z TV series the eleventh best anime production of all time.

Guillermo del Toro has cited the show—which was a huge success in his native Mexico during the 1980s—as an important influence on Pacific Rim.

See also 
Daimajin
Ichirou Mizuki

References

External links 
 
 Mazinger Z  at Toei Animation
 

1972 anime television series debuts
1972 manga
1974 Japanese television series endings
Anime series based on manga
Discotek Media
Fuji TV original programming
Kodansha manga
Mazinger
Shōnen manga
Super robot anime and manga
Shueisha manga
Toei Animation television
Topcraft
Viz Media anime